Robert J. Smullen (born July 29, 1968) is an American politician from the state of New York. A Republican, Smullen has represented the 118th district of the New York State Assembly, covering parts of the North Country and Mohawk Valley, since 2019.

Career
Smullen served 24 years with the United States Marine Corps, retiring in 2015 at the rank of colonel. He was a White House Fellow in the Office of the Secretary of Energy in 2003 and 2004, and more recently worked as the executive director of the Hudson River–Black River Regulating District.

Electoral history
In April 2018, after longtime Republican Assemblyman Marc W. Butler announced his retirement, Smullen launched his campaign for the 118th Assembly district. Smullen defeated businessman Patrick Vincent in the Republican primary, and bested Democrat Keith Rubino in the November general election with 63% of the vote.

Tax violations
In July 2018, while running for the Assembly, Smullen was arrested after he accepted a tax exemption for veterans on two residences at once, a felony. Maintaining that the double filing had been a mistake, Smullen pleaded guilty to a reduced charge in May 2019 after he paid back the town of Niskayuna for the missing property tax.

Personal life
Smullen lives on a farm in Johnstown with his wife, Megan, and their four children.

References

Living people
People from Johnstown, New York
Republican Party members of the New York State Assembly
21st-century American politicians
The Citadel, The Military College of South Carolina alumni
Georgetown University alumni
Dwight D. Eisenhower School for National Security and Resource Strategy alumni
1968 births